Per Spjuth (born 1 April 1980) is a Swedish bandy player who currently plays for Slottsbrons IF as a defender. He left BS BolticGöta during the pre-season after struggling to break into the squad. He is the older brother of the Hammarby IF player Kalle Spjuth and younger brother of the IK Tellus player Ola Spjuth.

Per has played for three clubs:
 Oxelösunds IK (1999-2002)
 BS BolticGöta (2000-2006)
 Slottsbrons IF (2006-)

External links

Swedish bandy players
Living people
1980 births
IF Boltic players